The JW Marriott Surabaya, opened in 1996, is a five-star luxury hotel with 25-story building, located at Downtown Tunjungan Surabaya. The restaurant at the hotel serves Chinese, Japanese, and International dishes.

References 

Surabaya
Hotel buildings completed in 1996
Hotels established in 1996
Hotels in Surabaya
Skyscrapers in Surabaya